Asbury United Methodist Church and Bethel Chapel and Cemetery is a national historic district containing a Methodist church, chapel, and cemetery at 19 Old Post Road in Croton-on-Hudson, Westchester County, New York. The church was built in 1883 and is a rectangular brick building with a multi-colored slate-covered gable roof in the Gothic Revival style. It features large Gothic-arched stained and leaded glass windows added in 1891 and a square, engaged, two stage tower.  The chapel was built about 1790 and is a -story, two-by-two-bay, clapboard-sided building on a granite foundation. Francis Asbury (1745–1816) is known to have visited the chapel on September 20, 1795. The cemetery is in two sections and contains about 5,000 graves; the date of the earliest burial is 1801.  It includes the grave of noted playwright and author Lorraine Hansberry (1930–1965).

It was added to the National Register of Historic Places in 2000.

See also
 National Register of Historic Places listings in northern Westchester County, New York

References

External links
 
 Asbury United Methodist Church website
 

United Methodist churches in New York (state)
Churches on the National Register of Historic Places in New York (state)
Cemeteries on the National Register of Historic Places in New York (state)
National Register of Historic Places in Westchester County, New York
Federal architecture in New York (state)
Churches completed in 1790
18th-century Methodist church buildings in the United States
Cemeteries in Westchester County, New York
Methodist cemeteries
1790 establishments in New York (state)
Historic districts on the National Register of Historic Places in New York (state)